"It's Complicated" is a song by Slovene duo Maraaya, featuring Slovene duo BQL. It was written by Raay, Marjetka Vovk and Charlie Mason. This is Maraaya's fifth and BQL's third single which premiered on 26 May 2017 in front of the live audience on the Cankar street in Ljubljana. This song and video was officially released on 7 June 2017 at Nika Records. Since 17 June 2017 available worldwide on iTunes, Spotify and Deezer.

Music video

The video was shot in Spain with international cooperation of Estonian Vita Pictura Productions. According to Raay, Maraaya and BQL do not perform in the video with the intention to appear more mysterious, as it is popular with videos these days.

Other versions

Croatian version 
"Sjaj", is the Croatian-language version of the song "It's Complicated", with the Croatian lyrics written by Fayo. It was officially released on 9 June 2017 by Croatia Records and Nika Records. Although the song already premiered at Deezer on 18 April 2017, it was released at iTunes on 20 April 2017 and prepremiered at CMC Vodice 2017 album on 28 April 2017.

On 10 June 2017, they performed at the biggest Croatian pop music festival CMC Vodice 2017, where they were invited, as organizers chose this single for this festival.

Formats and track listings 

Digital download
"It's Complicated" – 3:40

Digital download (Croatian version)
"Sjaj"  – 3:40

Credits and personnel 

 Raay – music, lyrics, producer
 Marjetka Vovk – music, lyrics, vocals
 Charlie Mason – lyrics
 Raay Music (Raay, Art Hunter, T. Snare) – production, arrangement
 Anej Piletič (BQL) – guitar, back vocals
 Rok Piletič (BQL) – back vocals

Charts

Weekly charts

It's Complicated

Release history

It's Complicated

Sjaj

References 

2017 songs
2017 singles
Songs with lyrics by Charlie Mason (lyricist)